Anna DeCosta Banks (September 2, 1869 – November 29, 1930) was employed at the Hospital and Training School for Nurses in Charleston, South Carolina, where she was the first head nurse. Banks is known for her nursing career, as well as a later position held as superintendent for 32 years at the same training school for nurses. Specifically designed for women of color, this hospital was later renamed McClennan-Banks Memorial Hospital in her honor.

Early life and education 
Anna DeCosta Banks was born on September 2, 1869, in Charleston, South Carolina. She attended Charleston Public Schools for her primary education. In 1891 she graduated from Hampton Institute, now known as Hampton University, in Virginia, where she was one of the first students to earn a diploma. Afterwards, she enrolled in Hampton's Dixie Hospital of Nursing, where she was one of the school's first graduates.

Career 
Banks was the first head nurse at the Hospital and Training School for Nurses in Charleston, South Carolina, located at 135 Cannon Street. This hospital was later renamed to McClennan-Banks Memorial Hospital. She became the Superintendent of Nurses, a position she held for 32 years. Throughout her career she focused on seeking more equitable health care for African Americans, caring for many impoverished African-American patients while only charging them the cost of board and medicine.

Additionally, Banks wrote an article in 1899 regarding the issues African-American nurses faced for the Hampton Training School for Nurses and Dixie Hospital. At this time, segregation affected where African-American nurses were able to work. Banks stressed the need for funding and donations at various hospitals to provide practical training for African-American nurses.

Meanwhile, Banks also privately worked as a visiting public-health nurse for the Ladies Benevolent Society for Charleston. She served this society for twenty-four years and as a collector interacting with black policyholders for the Metropolitan Life Insurance Company.

Personal life 
Banks was the daughter of Samuel and Elizabeth DeCosta. She married Issiah Banks, and in 1889 she gave birth to Evangeline Banks Harrison in Hampton, Virginia. Harrison went on to become the Medical Records Librarian at McClennan-Banks Memorial Hospital, which was partly named in honor of her mother.

Legacy 
When Banks died, the society gave her the tribute: "All ages, classes, races, called her blessed". Banks had such a significant effect on nursing within the state of South Carolina that the Medical University of South Carolina named a wing of their hospital after her. In 1930, Banks passed away and was known as the oldest nurse working in South Carolina at the time. In addition, the name of the Hospital and Training School for Nurses was changed to McClennan-Banks Hospital. However, this hospital closed in 1977.

References

People from Charleston, South Carolina
1930 deaths
1869 births
American nurses
American women nurses
Hampton University alumni
African-American nurses